Orthoprosopa xylotaeformis is a species of hoverfly in the family Syrphidae.

Distribution
Australia. Originally given as Chile in error.

References

Eristalinae
Insects described in 1868
Diptera of Australasia
Taxa named by Ignaz Rudolph Schiner